The following is a list of players and who appeared in at least one game for the Philadelphia Athletics franchise, which played in the American Association from 1882–1890.

Players in bold are in the Baseball Hall of Fame.


A
Tug Arundel
Al Atkinson
Jake Aydelott

B
Jersey Bakely
Kid Baldwin
George Bausewine
Ed Beatin
Lou Bierbauer
Jud Birchall
Bill Blair
Bob Blakiston
George Bradley
Jack Brennan
Jim Brown

C
Sam Campbell
Bart Cantz
Ed Carfrey
George Carman
Tommy Casey
Frank Chapman
Ed Clark
John Coleman
Bill Collins
Ben Conroy
Jim Conway
Fred Corey
George Crawford
Lave Cross
Bill Crowley
Ed Cushman

D
Joe Daly
Jerry Dorgan

E
Henry Easterday
Bob Emslie
Duke Esper

F
Bill Farmer
Bill Farrell
Frank Fennelly
Dennis Fitzgerald
Ed Flanagan
Robert Foster
Eddie Fusselback

G
Bob Gamble
Charlie Gessner
Whitey Gibson
Bill Gleason
Jack Gleason
James Graham
Ed Green
Bill Greenwood
Ed Greer
Tom Gunning

H
Ed Halbriter
Bill Hart
Pete Hasney
Horace Helmbold
Charlie Hilsey
Sadie Houck
Al Hubbard
Bill Hughes
Mickey Hughes
William Hyndman

I
John Irwin

J
Jack Jones

K
Joe Kappel
Charlie Kelly
Ted Kennedy
Bill Kienzle
Lon Knight
Ed Knouff
Andy Knox

L
William Lackey
Doc Landis
Henry Larkin
Juice Latham
Tom Lovett
Denny Lyons

M
Macey (first name unknown)
Fred Mann
John Mansell
Mike Mansell
Charlie Mason
Bobby Mathews
Mike Mattimore
Dick McBride
Chippy McGarr
Sadie McMahon
George Meyers
Cyclone Miller
Jocko Milligan
Frank Mountain
Mike Moynahan

N

O
Jack O'Brien
Ed O'Neil

P
Ed Pabst
Tom Poorman
Jim Powell
Bill Price
Blondie Purcell

Q
Joe Quest
Marshall Quinton

R
Charlie Reynolds
John Richmond
John Riddle
Frank Ringo
Wilbert Robinson
Chief Roseman
Ed Rowen
Jim Roxburgh

S
Al Sauter
Jimmy Say
Lou Say
Ed Seward
Taylor Shafer
Orator Shafer
Frank Siffell
Phenomenal Smith
Pop Smith
Rex Smith
Charles Snyder
George Snyder
Stafford
Charlie Stecher
Sterling
Harry Stine
Harry Stovey
Joe Straub
Cub Stricker
George Strief
Mike Sullivan
Bill Sweeney
Ham Sweigert

T
Billy Taylor
Ledell Titcomb
George Townsend

U

V
Bill Vinton

W
Sam Weaver
Curt Welch
Gus Weyhing
Jim Whitney

X

Y

Z
Frank Zinn

External links
Baseball Reference

Major League Baseball all-time rosters